The Séoune is a  long river in the Lot, Tarn-et-Garonne and Lot-et-Garonne départements, southwestern France. Its source is at Sauzet. It flows generally southwest. It is a right tributary of the Garonne into which it flows between Lafox and Boé, near Agen.

Départements and communes along its course
This list is ordered from source to mouth: 
 Lot: Sauzet, Carnac-Rouffiac, Bagat-en-Quercy, Fargues, Montcuq, Belmontet, Valprionde, 
 Tarn-et-Garonne: Belvèze, Bouloc, Lauzerte, Montagudet, Touffailles, Miramont-de-Quercy, Fauroux, Brassac, Castelsagrat, Montjoi
 Lot-et-Garonne: Saint-Maurin
 Tarn-et-Garonne: Perville
 Lot-et-Garonne: Tayrac, Puymirol, Saint-Pierre-de-Clairac, Castelculier, Lafox, Boé

References

Rivers of France
Rivers of Lot (department)
Rivers of Tarn-et-Garonne
Rivers of Lot-et-Garonne
Rivers of Nouvelle-Aquitaine
Rivers of Occitania (administrative region)